Heliothela ophideresana is a species of moth of the family Crambidae. It is widespread species, found in South Africa, Libya, Malawi, Namibia, Nigeria, Madagascar, Tanzania, Saudi Arabia, Yemen, Oman, United Arab Emirates, India, India, Sri Lanka, Afghanistan and in Australia, where it has been caught in Queensland.

References

Heliothelini
Moths of Australia
Moths described in 1863
Moths of Madagascar
Lepidoptera of West Africa
Lepidoptera of Namibia
Lepidoptera of Malawi
Lepidoptera of Tanzania
Moths of the Middle East
Moths of Africa